Stewart House and Howard–Stewart Family Cemetery is a historic home and family cemetery located in Jefferson, Schoharie County, New York.  It was built about 1857, and is a two-story, "T"-plan Greek Revival style timber frame farmhouse with a -story side wing.  It is sheathed in clapboard, has a front gable roof, and Doric order corner pilasters.  Also on the property is a contributing family cemetery with burials dated from 1828 to 1881.

It was listed on the National Register of Historic Places in 2012.

References

Houses on the National Register of Historic Places in New York (state)
Greek Revival architecture in New York (state)
Houses completed in 1857
Buildings and structures in Schoharie County, New York
National Register of Historic Places in Schoharie County, New York
Cemeteries on the National Register of Historic Places in New York (state)
1857 establishments in New York (state)